Lawrence "Larry" Warbasse (born June 28, 1990) is an American professional road racing cyclist, who currently rides for UCI WorldTeam .

Career

Born in Dearborn, Michigan, Warbasse currently resides in Traverse City, Michigan, United States. Warbasse is a University of Michigan graduate. He was named in the start list for the 2016 Giro d'Italia, but abandoned the race on Stage 6.

In 2019, Warbasse finished in the top 5 in both the road race and the time trial at the United States National Road Championships. In the 2020 Giro d'Italia, he finished 17th, a career best, just behind French teammate Aurélien Paret-Peintre; the pair were the best placed  riders in the race.

Major results

2008
 9th Overall Tour de l'Abitibi
2011
 5th Time trial, National Under-23 Road Championships
 5th Overall Tour de Berlin
 5th Liège–Bastogne–Liège Espoirs
 7th Overall Istrian Spring Trophy
 7th Overall Flèche du Sud
 8th Gran Premio Palio del Recioto
2012
 4th Time trial, National Under-23 Road Championships
 5th Overall Ronde de l'Isard
 6th Chrono Champenois
 8th Gran Premio Palio del Recioto
2013
 1st Stage 2 (TTT) Tour of Qatar
2015
 8th Overall Bayern–Rundfahrt
2016
 7th Overall Tour de Pologne
2017
 National Road Championships
1st  Road race
5th Time trial
 1st Stage 4 Tour de Suisse
 8th Overall Tour of Norway
2018
 4th Time trial, National Road Championships
 10th La Drôme Classic
2019
 National Road Championships
4th Time trial
5th Road race

Grand Tour general classification results timeline

References

External links

Cycling Base: Lawrence Warbasse
USA Cycling: Lawrence Warbasse
BMC Racing Team: Larry Warbasse

1990 births
Living people
American male cyclists
University of Michigan alumni
Sportspeople from Dearborn, Michigan
Cyclists from Michigan
Tour de Suisse stage winners